A fable is a story intended to illustrate a moral.

Fable(s), The Fable(s), or A Fable may also refer to:

Literature
 Aesop's Fables, a collection of fables from ancient Greece
 La Fontaine's Fables, several volumes by Jean de La Fontaine 1668–1694
 Fables, Ancient and Modern, a 1700 book by John Dryden
 Fables, several volumes by Ivan Krylov, beginning in 1809
 Schleicher's fable, an 1868 reconstructed Proto-Indo-European text by August Schleicher
 Fables, an 1885 cycle of satirical fairy tales by Mikhail Saltykov-Shchedrin
 A Fable, a 1954 novel by William Faulkner
 Fables (Lobel book), a 1980 children's picture book by Arnold Lobel
 Fables (comics), a Vertigo comic book series launched in 2002
 The Fable, a 2014–2019 manga series by Katsuhisa Minam, and two film adaptations
 Business fable, a type of motivational fiction

Music

Performers
 Fable (singer) (born 1995), English musician and singer
 The Fables (band), a Canadian Celtic rock group

Albums
 Fable (album), by Faye Wong, 2000
 A Fable (album), by Tigran Hamasyan, 2011
 Fables (England Dan & John Ford Coley album), 1972
 Fables (Jean-Luc Ponty album), 1985
 Immaculate Machine's Fables, by Immaculate Machine, 2007
 Fables, by 8stops7, 2012
 Fable, an EP by Switchblade Symphony, 1991
 Fable, an EP by Vallis Alps, 2017

Songs
 "Fable" (song), by Robert Miles, 1996
 "Fables", by the Dodos from Time to Die, 2009

Video games
 Fable (1996 video game), an adventure game by Simbiosis Interactive
 Fable (video game series), a video game series by Lionhead Studios
 Fable (2004 video game), the first of the series

Other uses
 Fable (TV play), a 1965 British installment in the Wednesday Play series
 Fables, a cartoon series produced by Screen Gems 1939-1942
 The Fable (El Greco), a 1580 painting by El Greco

See also
 
 Aesop's Fables (disambiguation)